Yulha Station is a station of Daegu Subway Line 1 in Yulha-dong, Dong District, Daegu, South Korea. Two exits was established in 2010. There is a Beomanno road to south. Apartments were built by new city development to the neighborhood.

External links 
 DTRO virtual station

Dong District, Daegu
Daegu Metro stations
Railway stations opened in 1998